Exiguobacterium oxidotolerans is a Gram-positive, alkaliphilic, facultative anaerobic and motile bacterium from the genus of Exiguobacterium which has been isolated from a fish processing plant.

References

Bacillaceae
Bacteria described in 2004